Leo Pokrowsky (died 25 December 1900 in Utrecht, Kwazulu Natal, South Africa) was a Pole and Captain in the Russian Army, who fought and died on the side of the Boers during the Second Anglo-Boer War.  He was killed on Christmas Day 1900 when he and his men attacked the British garrison in Utrecht.

A commemorative plaque to his memory can be seen on the Burgher monument in the town of Utrecht.

References

1900 deaths
Military personnel killed in the Second Boer War
Boer military personnel of the Second Boer War
Year of birth unknown